This is a list of tropical and subtropical moist broadleaf forest ecoregions, arranged by biogeographic realm.

Afrotropical realm

Australasian realm

Indomalayan realm

Neotropical realm

Oceanian realm

Palearctic realm

See also
Biome
Ecoregion
Tropical and subtropical moist broadleaf forests
Tropical rainforest

 List
Tropical and subtropical moist broadleaf